Gary Douglas Hardgrave (born 5 January 1960) is a former Australian politician who served in the House of Representatives from 1996 to 2007, representing the Liberal Party. He was a minister in the Howard Government from 2001 to 2007, and later served as Administrator of Norfolk Island from 2014 to 2017.

Early life
Hardgrave was born in Sydney, New South Wales, and was educated at Griffith University, Queensland. In the 1970s he began his career as a radio broadcaster, and a TV reporter firstly with the award-winning Australian children's television show Wombat between 1979 and 1982. Between 1982 and 1986 he reported for award-winning Queensland TV programme State Affair, in 1987 for ABC TV's The 7.30 Report before returning to BTQ 7 in 1988 as a senior reporter for Carroll at Seven. In 1989 he was the founding news director for SEA-FM Gold Coast and later worked as a media adviser to Liberal politicians, before entering politics.

Politics
Hardgrave initially ran for election to the Queensland state seat of Sunnybank in the 1992 election, but lost. He contested the Division of Moreton successfully at the 1996 federal election against Labor incumbent Garrie Gibson, going on to retain the seat in 1998, 2001 and 2004.

Hardgrave served as Minister for Citizenship and Multicultural Affairs from 2001 to 2004, Minister for Vocational and Technical Education between October 2004 to early 2007 and Minister Assisting the Prime Minister from 7 October 2003 to 30 January 2007.  On 23 January 2007, Hardgrave was axed from the ministry and returned to the backbench. He lost his seat to Graham Perrett in the 2007 election.

Later activities
In March 2008, Hardgrave returned to media and corporate activities. From January 2011 he hosted talk-back in Brisbane. From 2011 he made regular contributions to Sky News Agenda and Paul Murray Live programmes as well as regular appearances on the Nine Network Today show and A Current Affair.

Since leaving Parliament, Hardgrave graduated from the Australian Institute of Company Directors' course and served on a variety of company and community boards including Brisbane Airport Corporation and TAFE Queensland. In January 2014, he left full-time radio but commenced a weekly column in the Queensland Sunday Mail newspaper before resigning media and corporate activities in June 2014.

On the advice of the Abbott Government, Australian Governor-General Sir Peter Cosgrove appointed Hardgrave as the 37th Administrator of the Australian External Territory of Norfolk Island. His term commenced on 1 July 2014, and he was Administrator when Norfolk Island lost its self-governing status.

He later went on to host a ‘Sky After Dark’ political opinion show on conservative television station Sky News Australia, where he is a regular critic of among other things, Labor Party MPs and action on climate change.

References 

 

|-

1960 births
Living people
Administrators of Norfolk Island
Liberal Party of Australia members of the Parliament of Australia
Members of the Australian House of Representatives for Moreton
Members of the Australian House of Representatives
People educated at MacGregor State High School
Griffith University alumni
Politicians from Sydney
21st-century Australian politicians
20th-century Australian politicians
Government ministers of Australia